Maria Luisa Tucker (born August 20, 1979) is an American journalist. She currently resides in New York City and is an editor at Youth Communication. She was formerly a staff writer at The Village Voice.

Education
Tucker graduated with honors from Texas State University - San Marcos in 2000 with a B.A. in journalism. In 2006, she received an M.A. in American Studies from Columbia University.

Work experience
Tucker started her journalism career while still at Texas State University, writing for The University Star, and was published in the Pulitzer-prize winning Fort Wayne News Sentinel. Since then, she has written for the Phoenix New Times, The Press-Enterprise, and Austin Monthly Magazine. By 2002, Tucker was a staff writer for the Santa Fe Reporter and remained there until her move to New York City.

While working towards her M.A., Tucker was an associate editor at the Columbia Journal of American Studies. Upon graduation in 2005, she was hired by AlterNet, where she stayed until late spring of 2006. Her contributions to the website included stories on immigration and social justice.

The Village Voice
Tucker's first freelance article for The Village Voice appeared in July 2006. She then joined the staff in 2007 and has since written about a white supremacist group visiting New York City, rezoning battles in the Lower East Side and Harlem, as well as providing in-depth coverage of the Brigitte Harris trial.

Awards
Tucker has won two awards during her employment at the Santa Fe Reporter. New Mexico Press Association awarded her 1st place in the "Investigative Reporting" category in 2002. The following year, the Association of Alternative Newsweeklies awarded her 1st place in the "Media Reporting" category in 2003.

Notes and references

External links
Youth Communication

1979 births
Living people
American women journalists
21st-century American women